North Sydney railway station is located on the North Shore line, serving the Sydney suburb of North Sydney. It is served by Sydney Trains T1 North Shore Line and T9 Northern Line services.

History
North Sydney station opened on 20 March 1932 at the same time as the North Shore line over the Sydney Harbour Bridge. Prior to the bridge's opening, North Shore line trains had diverged from the current line at Waverton to the original Milsons Point station at Lavender Bay.

The station was built in a rock cutting with a street level overhead concourse above the platforms. The station has four platforms which correspond with the four railway tracks that were designed to cross the Sydney Harbour Bridge. At the Waverton end of the station there are four tunnels which have been cut into the rock. Unused tunnel stubs of 260 metres for proposed lines to Newport and Northbridge were cut at the same time with Chief Design Engineer John Bradfield calculating that without these, later construction of these lines would interfere with the North Shore line.

From 1932 until 1958, two of the rail tracks designed for the bridge were used by trams, the latter being diverted onto Blue Street just before they would have entered North Sydney Station. After 1958 the tram tracks were removed from the Sydney Harbour Bridge and replaced by the Cahill Expressway.

Beginning in the 1968 when the North Sydney Travelodge was built, the air rights over the station have progressively been redeveloped. In December 1972, the awning over platforms 3 and 4 was demolished. The station became totally enclosed with the opening of Zurich Insurance House in 1984.

From 4 September 2005 to 28 May 2006 it was the major terminus of the Hornsby via Strathfield line. From 20 October 2013 to 25 November 2017 it was the major terminus for Emu Plains all stops services. Starting from 26 November 2017, North Sydney station is the major terminus of the Richmond Line to allow customers to change for a train.

Upgrade
Between April 2006 and December 2008, the station was upgraded to handle extra traffic expected with the opening of the Epping to Chatswood line in 2009. The work included an expanded concourse and the installation of escalators and lifts.

Platforms and services
The four platforms at North Sydney can have different usages, but the outer platforms are generally the only ones used in off-peak; the middle platforms generally serve terminating trains arriving from the city. Because the four platforms at North Sydney serve a double track railway to the north and south of the station, it has significant capacity for terminating traffic.

The line north through the tunnel from Platform 3 was not laid until 1992 and commissioned in August 1993. The tunnel roads serving platforms 2 and 3 both have a 10 km/h speed limit and are occasionally used by passenger services.

Bus Services

Historic photos

References

External links

North Sydney station details Transport for New South Wales
North Sydney Station Public Transport Map Transport for NSW
Upgrade works Flickr gallery

Easy Access railway stations in Sydney
Railway stations in Sydney
Railway stations in Australia opened in 1932
North Sydney, New South Wales
North Shore railway line